Aguada, originally San Francisco de Asís de la Aguada, is a town and municipality of Puerto Rico, located in the western coastal valley region bordering the Atlantic Ocean, east of Rincón, west of Aguadilla and Moca; and north of Añasco and Mayagüez. It is part of the Aguadilla-Isabela-San Sebastián Metropolitan Statistical Area. Aguada's population is spread over 17 barrios and Aguada Pueblo (the downtown area and the administrative center of the city).

Etymology and nicknames 
The name Aguada is a shortening of the town's original name San Francisco de Asís de la Aguada. The word aguada literally translates to "watery" or "watered down" from Spanish, possibly a reference to the town's strategic importance as a port in the Mona Passage and the Atlantic Ocean.

The municipality has many nicknames: La Villa de Sotomayor ("Sotomayor's Villa") is a reference to one of the town's Spanish founders, Cristóbal de Sotomayor; La Ciudad del Descubrimiento ("City of the Discovery") is a reference to the possibility that Christopher Columbus first landed in Puerto Rico at what is today the municipality's territory; El Pueblo Playero translates to "the beach town" and La Ciudad del Vaticano ("the Vatican's City") which references the town's early importance for Catholicism in the island.

History
A Taíno settlement called Aymamón was located close to the Culebrinas River.

Some sources say that Christopher Columbus entered the island of Puerto Rico through Aguada on his second voyage in November 1493.

In July 1510, Cristóbal de Sotomayor received control of the area from Juan Ponce de León and renamed the town Villa de Sotomayor. ↵ However, in 1511 the settlement was attacked and burned by the local Taínos. That same year, the Spanish crown ordered a monastery be established in Puerto Rico, and the Ermita de Espinar was founded. The name of the area was then changed to San Francisco de Asís de la Aguada, since the friars were Franciscan. The monastery was finished in 1516. In 1526, King Charles I of Spain officially founded the Aguada settlement. However, in 1529, Taínos attacked the monastery killing the friars and burning the settlement.

The Taínos, indigenous people of Puerto Rico, were believed to have practiced polytheism. As the Spanish began to colonize the Caribbean area, they wanted to convert the natives to Catholicism. The Caribs destroyed a church of Franciscans in Aguada and killed five of its members in 1579.

Still, Aguada resurfaced and became a stopover point for ships on their way to Spain from South America. On September 17, 1662, King Charles II of Spain emitted a Royal Decree declaring Aguada a "village" and assigning Juan López de Segura as First Lieutenant.

In 1737, Philip V, King of Spain, declared that all mail en route to Venezuela and other South American countries from Puerto Rico should exit from Aguada's ports, leading to the area's economic growth. Also, an increase in population has been attributed to possible desertions from foreign merchant ships.

Puerto Rico was ceded by Spain in the aftermath of the Spanish–American War under the terms of the Treaty of Paris of 1898 and became an unincorporated territory of the United States. In 1899, the United States Department of War conducted its first census of Puerto Rico finding that the population of Aguada was 10,581.

In the early years of the 20th century, two disasters affected the town of Aguada. First, a huge fire in 1912 destroyed most of the town buildings, including the old city hall, which contained all the city archives. On October 11, 1918, at  an earthquake known as the San Fermín earthquake destroyed the church and other structures.

Hurricane María on September 20, 2017, triggered numerous landslides in Aguada, with its strong winds and heavy rain. Infrastructure and an estimated 8,000 homes in Aguada were damaged or destroyed. Two police officers died when they were caught in the flooded Culebrinas River.

Folklore

 (The Aguada Shark Killer) is folklore that comes out of Aguada and was written around 1640. It tells of a young man who was accustomed to fighting sharks but was without his religious charm. When asked to demonstrate his shark-fighting capabilities to visiting Spanish dignitaries, he hesitated. All day and night he pondered whether he could fight a shark without his religious charm. Even though the Spaniards had increased their offer to 3 bars of gold the matador was hesitant. He jumped into the open sea pursuing the shark and fought it with his bare hands. He was nearly killed and after receiving his prize of gold, vowed to never again fight a shark.

Geography
Aguada is located in the west coast of the island of Puerto Rico. It borders the Atlantic Ocean and Aguadilla on the north, Moca on the east, Añasco on the south, and Rincón on the west. Aguada is part of the Coastal Plains of the West, which features alluvial and fertile terrain. Although the terrain is mostly plain, there are some mountains to the south and southeast.

Among the mountains located in Aguada are the Atalaya Peak, located within the limits of Aguada and Rincón.

Water features
Aguada's hydrographic system is composed of the Río Culebrinas, Río Grande, Río Cañas, Río Culebra, Río Guayabo, and Río Ingenio. All of these rivers flow into the Mona Passage. There are ten beaches in Aguada. Aguada has an area of 45.55 square miles and 14.62% are water bodies.

Barrios

Like all municipalities of Puerto Rico, Aguada is subdivided into barrios:

 Aguada barrio-pueblo
 Asomante
 Atalaya
 Carrizal
 Cerro Gordo
 Cruces
 Espinar
 Guanábano
 Guaniquilla
 Guayabo
 Jagüey
 Lagunas
 Mal Paso
 Mamey
 Marías
 Naranjo
 Piedras Blancas
 Río Grande

Sectors

Barrios (which are roughly comparable to minor civil divisions) in turn are further subdivided into smaller local populated place areas/units called sectores (which means sectors in English). The types of sectores may vary, from normally sector to urbanización to reparto to barriada to residencial, among others.

Special Communities 

 (Special Communities of Puerto Rico) are marginalized communities whose citizens are experiencing a certain amount of social exclusion. A map shows these communities occur in nearly every municipality of the commonwealth.

Demographics

In 2020, the population of Aguada decreased by 9.1% to 38,136. In 2010, the population of Aguada was 41,959, which represented a small decrease from the 42,042 registered in the 2000 Census. Until its decrease in 2010, Aguada's population had been increasing steadily.

According to the 2020 Census, 22.7% of the population identifies themselves as White, and 10.6% as Black. Also, according to the census, the population is equally divided by gender (49.1% are males, while 50.1% are females). Finally, 23.7% of the population is under 18 years old. The next biggest percentage of population (20.8%) is between 35 and 49 years old.

Economy

Historically, the economy of Aguada was mostly based on the processing of sugarcane. The Central Coloso, located in the Guanábano barrio of Aguada, was one of the most important refineries in the island. It was also the last one to cease operations, officially closing in 2003.

Aside from sugar mills, there was also a cattle and wood industry. As of 2012, the economy relies mostly on small businesses and manufacturing.

In late 2014, the government announced a $172 million deal with private investors to restart sugar production in Puerto Rico for the purpose of supplying the island rum producers with up to 56% of the molasses needed. The plan involved building a new processing plant on the grounds of the old Coloso Sugar Cane factory in Aguada.

Tourism
Aguada is part of the Porta del Sol touristic region in Puerto Rico. The Porta del Sol website highlights Aguada's town square and beaches as its most notable touristic attractions. It also mentions landmarks like the Espinar Hermitage Ruins and a children playground.

Landmarks and places of interest

 Aguada Museum (located in a former railroad station building)
Church of San Francisco de Asís
 Coloso Sugar Cane Refinery
 La Cruz de Culebrinas
 Pico de Piedra Beach
 Playa Espinar
 Loma Linda Stables
 Aguada transmission station, the tallest man-made structure in Puerto Rico
 The Aguada Pyramid

The Puente de Coloso, built in 1928, is an 85-ft-long bridge which crosses over the Culebrinas River, and is located between the Guanábano and Espinar barrios in Aguada. It is recognized for its historic significance.

Human resources

Education
Like all other municipalities in the island, public education is overseen by the Puerto Rico Department of Education. In 2020, there were 11 public schools in Aguada, most of them in the elementary level.

Public health
Although there are no hospitals in Aguada, the town does have a small emergency medical center located near the town center.

Culture

Festivals and events
Aguada celebrates its patron saint festival in October. The  is a religious and cultural celebration in honor of Saint Francis of Assisi that generally features parades, games, artisans, amusement rides, regional food, and live entertainment.

Other festivals and events celebrated in Aguada include:

 (Three Kings Festival) which is celebrated in January at  park. It is an activity dedicated to children of Aguada and is celebrated with gifts, music, clowns, and raffles.

Every year in November, a parade called  takes place to remember the discovery of Puerto Rico by Christopher Columbus.

 is held on the last weekend of May in the Atalaya barrio, with exhibitions of different goat breeds and competitions.

Carved wooden saints are on exhibition and for sale.

Sports
Los Santeros de Aguada is the name of Aguada's former basketball team.

Transportation
The main road leading to Aguada is PR-115, if you're coming from the north. If you're traveling from the south, you have to take PR-2.

There are 18 bridges in Aguada.

Government

Mayors

All municipalities in Puerto Rico are administered by a mayor, elected every four years. The mayor of Aguada is Christian Cortes.

This is a list of registered and known mayors of Aguada, until present time.

Senate
The city belongs to the Puerto Rico Senatorial district IV of Mayagüez-Aguadilla, which is represented by two Senators.

House of Representatives
The city is represented in the 18th District which is represented by one representative.

Local Legislature
All municipalities have a local legislature.

Symbols
The  has an official flag and coat of arms.

Flag

Aguada's flag was designed by Pedro Vélez Adróvar. It features three main colors: white, red, and yellow. White represents purity and the waters of Culebrinas River. Over the white field, a blue triangle with a white dove is featured. The dove is the symbol of peace that unites the towns. Red symbolizes the martyrdom of Franciscan friars from Espinal. Over the red field, there's a black cross which represents the birth of Christianity in Puerto Rico. The name of "Aguada" is also above the cross. The yellow field represents happiness and hospitality of the residents. Over the yellow field, there's a white star which symbolizes the hope of the town for more development and progress.

Coat of Arms

The coat of arms is divided into two main fields. The upper field features a cross, with the interlaced arms of Christ and Father Saint Francis. It is taken from the badge of the Order of Friars Minor. It represents the motto "Pax et Bonum", which means "peace and good will between man and the Redeemer". The sun below the cross symbolizes the light that brightens the world. The lower part of the shield consists of five ships that symbolize the second voyage of Christopher Columbus, who allegedly arrived at the western "Guaniquilla" coast on November 19, 1493, to gather water. Although the precise location is disputed, the Aguada wells is a plausible site for the actual event.

The mural crown in the upper part of the shield signifies the title of village, that was given to this town by King Charles III in 1778. The official colors of the shield are red, which stands for the fraternal love in Aguada; gold, for the Spanish royalty in Puerto Rico; green, for the island's hope and fertility; black, for the wooden beam of the cross; blue, for the sky and the kingship of God; and white, for Christ's purity and the purity of the people of the town toward the cultural patrimony.

Nicknames
Aguada has various nicknames, most of them pertaining to its origins. One is "La Villa del Sotomayor" ("Sotomayor Village"), which was the name originally given to it by Cristóbal de Sotomayor during its colonization in 1510. It is also called "Villa de San Francisco de Asís de la Aguada", which was the name given to the region when the Franciscan friars took control of it. Aguada is also called "La Ciudad del Descubrimiento" ("City of the Discovery") in reference to it being one of the possible places where Christopher Columbus entered the island. Other nicknames are "El Pueblo Playero" ("The Beach Town") for its many beaches, and "La Ciudad del Vaticano" ("The Vatican City") for being considered the "capital of Catholicism" in the island.

Anthem
Aguada's anthem was written by Rolando Acevedo Lorenzo.

Notable "Aguadeños" 
 Ismael Miranda – Salsa Singer
 Guillermo "Willie" Hernandez – former Major League Baseball (MLB) pitcher and winner of the 1984 American League MVP and Cy Young Abarrios.
 Andrés Torres – Major League Baseball (MLB) player (San Francisco Giants)
 Zoilo Cajigas Sotomayor – Wood carving artist, especially religious figurines

Gallery

See also

List of Puerto Ricans
History of Puerto Rico
National Register of Historic Places listings in Aguada, Puerto Rico

References

Further reading

External links 
 Puerto Rico Government Directory – Aguada
 Aguada Municipality Brochure (Spanish)
 Proyecto Salón Hogar sobre Aguada (Spanish)
 Photos of Aguada
 Aguada Municipality on Facebook

Aguada, Puerto Rico
Municipalities of Puerto Rico
Populated coastal places in Puerto Rico
Populated places established in 1508
Aguadilla–Isabela–San Sebastián metropolitan area
1508 establishments in the Spanish Empire
Caribbean culture
North American folklore
Folklore by country
Latin American folklore
Folklore by region